The Emblem of Tamil Nadu is the official state emblem of Tamil Nadu and is used as the official state symbol of the Government of Tamil Nadu.

It consists of the Lion Capital of Ashoka without the bell lotus foundation and flanked on either side by an Indian flag. Behind the capital, is the image of a Gopuram or temple tower based on the Srivalliputhur Temple.

Designing
The state emblem was designed in 1949 by artist R. Krishna Rao who was a native of Madurai. Krishna Rao was honoured with awards and titles for his contribution to the state. A student of the Government College of Fine Arts and Crafts in Chennai, who went on to become the principal of the college later, Rao was approached to design the emblem in 1948, when he was a professor of applied arts in the college.

Around the rim of the seal runs an inscription in Tamil script, one at the top தமிழ் நாடு அரசு  ("Tamil Nadu Arasu" which translates to "Government of Tamil Nadu") and the other at the bottom வாய்மையே வெல்லும்  ("Vaymaiye Vellum" which translates to "Truth Alone Triumphs" also commonly known as "Satyameva Jayate" in Sanskrit). It is the only state emblem that has the Indian Flag and Hindu temple tower on its seal.

Deception 
Although the gopuram in the emblem is generic and specific references of Srivilliputhur Andal temple tower (gopuram) came to be known as the state emblem, even in government records due to the TKC-Reddy episode. But R Krishna Rao, the artist who created it said he had the Madurai Meenakshi Temple's west 'gopuram' in mind while designing a generic `gopuram' for the emblem. A monograph on Rao, published by the Lalit Kala Akademi quotes him as saying, "Hailing from Madurai, it was only proper that I should incorporate the Madurai temple in the state government's emblem."
 
Rao's student G Chandrashekaran, also a former principal of the college, feels the theory of Madurai temple being the inspiration may not be off the mark. "It could be said that the inspiration for designing the emblem came from the Madurai temple, as Krishna Rao had done several water colours of the structure. There are no records of him having painted the Srivilliputhur temple."

K Kamala, Krishna Rao's daughter and an artist herself, says that her father regretted the gopuram being wrongly identified all the time. "He always asked me to tell people that it was the Madurai gopuram and not of Srivilliputhur", says Kamala, adding that she got to see the original painting at the Government College of Fine Arts and Crafts in Chennai in 2009. "The features of the gopuram can be clearly seen in the original painting, and one could see very well that it is the Madurai gopuram. My father had painted the figurines of Siva and Parvati on the Rishaba vahanam, seen in the gopuram in the Madurai temple. That was a clear sign," she says.

Efforts to trace the original painting which is supposed to have been incorporated into the state emblem were futile.

Historical emblems

Government banner
The Government of Tamil Nadu can be represented by an image of the emblem of the state placed onto a white background. A flag was proposed in 1970 but was not formally adopted.

See also
 List of Tamil Nadu state symbols
 Flag of Tamil Nadu
 Tamil Thai Valthu
 National Emblem of India
 List of Indian state emblems

References

Government of Tamil Nadu
Tamil Nadu
Tamil Nadu
Tamil Nadu
Tamil Nadu
Tamil Nadu